In chemistry, brown carbon (Cbrown/BrC) is brown smoke released by the combustion of organic matter. It coexists with black carbon when released in the atmosphere.

Black carbon is primarily released by high-temperature combustion and brown carbon is emitted mainly by biomass combustion. These two are the two most important light absorbing substances in the atmosphere. The climate and radiative transfer are highly impacted by the absorptive properties of these substances.

Overview

Discovery 
Light absorbing aerosols have become an interest of study because of its effects on atmospheric warming.
While the function of black carbon created by biomass burning in relation to the warming of air has as of now been known, the lesser-known part of brown carbon has recently been discovered.

Brown carbon aerosols 
The way light reflects off brown carbon causes the material to appear brown or yellow. In respect to soot carbon (as an aerosol called black carbon) these light reflecting particles are collectively called brown carbon, highlighting their optical properties.

It was seen that particles from combustion or from residential coal usage can contain substantial amounts of brown carbon. This particulate matter appears light brown, and not black as would be expected for pure soot particles.

Effects

Influence on Earth's atmosphere 
Aerosols are one of the most important contributors to climate change in the atmosphere. Many of the particles suspended in the atmosphere originate from a multitude of sources. Some of these sources are natural and some of them are man-made. Most aerosols reflect sunlight, and some also absorb it. A lot of these nanoparticles cause severe health effects in addition to climate effects. There are many human activities that produce these particles.

Black carbon particles (a component of soot) originating from combustion processes have been known for some time to absorb sunlight and warm the atmosphere, and pollution controls have been put into place to reduce their emissions and their effects.

Brown carbon has attracted interest as a possible cause of climate change. This class of organic carbon, known for its brownish color, absorbs strongly in the ultraviolet wavelengths and less significantly going into the visible wavelengths. Types of brown carbon include tar materials from smoldering fires or coal combustion, breakdown products from biomass burning, a mixture of organic compounds emitted from soil, and volatile organic compounds given off by vegetation.

Black and brown carbon

Brown carbon in relation to black carbon 

Simulation models suggest that brown carbon contributes about 19% of the total atmospheric absorption by aerosols, while 72% is attributed to black carbon and 9% is due to the coating effect of sulfate and organic aerosols on black carbon. It seems that brown carbon can play an important role in photochemistry and the hydrologic cycle, especially over regions dominated by biomass combustion. Therefore, brown carbon needs to be considered in global climate change simulations for a more accurate understanding.

Mixture of black and brown 
Up to about 70% of light absorption is by black carbon. When Brown carbon is present independently it has nearly 15% potential to warm the atmosphere by absorbing light.

See also 
 Black carbon
 Environmental impact of the coal industry
 Diesel exhaust
 Soot
 Smoke
 Global dimming

References  

Carbon